Lac-au-Brochet is an unorganized territory in the Côte-Nord region of Quebec, Canada. It makes up over 83% of the La Haute-Côte-Nord Regional County Municipality.

The community of Labrieville is located approximately in the centre of the territory along the Betsiamites River. Named after Napoléon-Alexandre Labrie, bishop of the Diocese of Golfe St-Laurent, it was established in the 1950s as a work camp to accommodate Hydro-Québec workers constructing the Bersimis-1 and Bersimis-2 generating stations. The company town was fully serviced with a hospital, hotel, bank, and shopping plaza. Upon completion of the hydro-electric facilities, Hydro-Québec tried to find another buyer for the town. But this proved unsuccessful, and they transferred most houses and businesses to Forestville in 1974. The community now serves as an access point to the Labrieville ZEC but doesn't have any permanent resident.

Named after the northern pike (French: brochet), the Montagnais called it Tshinusheu Shakikan, also meaning Pike Lake.

Demographics
Population trend:
 Population in 2021: 0
 Population in 2016: 5
 Population in 2011: 0
 Population in 2006: 0
 Population in 2001: 0
 Population in 1996: 3
 Population in 1991: 0

See also
 List of unorganized territories in Quebec

References

Unorganized territories in Côte-Nord
La Haute-Côte-Nord Regional County Municipality